The 1st parallel north is a circle of latitude that is 1 degree (69.2 miles/111.36 kilometers) north of the Earth's equatorial plane.  It crosses the Atlantic Ocean, Africa, the Indian Ocean, Southeast Asia, the Pacific Ocean and South America.

The parallel defines part of the border between Equatorial Guinea and Gabon.

Around the world
Starting at the Prime Meridian, and heading eastwards, the parallel 1° north passes through:

{| class="wikitable plainrowheaders"
! scope="col" width="125" | Co-ordinates
! scope="col" | Country, territory or sea
! scope="col" | Notes
|-valign="top"
| style="background:#b0e0e6;" | 
! scope="row" style="background:#b0e0e6;" | Atlantic Ocean
| style="background:#b0e0e6;" | Passing just north of the island of Corisco,  Passing just north of the island of Elobey Grande, 
|-
| 
! scope="row" | 
| Island of Elobey Chico
|-
| style="background:#b0e0e6;" | 
! scope="row" style="background:#b0e0e6;" | Atlantic Ocean
| style="background:#b0e0e6;" |
|-
| 
! scope="row" | 
|
|-
| 
! scope="row" | 
|
|-
| 
! scope="row" |  /  border
|
|-
| 
! scope="row" | 
|
|-
| 
! scope="row" | 
|
|-
| 
! scope="row" | 
|
|-
| 
! scope="row" | 
|
|-
| 
! scope="row" | 
|
|-
| 
! scope="row" | 
|
|-
| style="background:#b0e0e6;" | 
! scope="row" style="background:#b0e0e6;" | Indian Ocean
| style="background:#b0e0e6;" | Passing just north of Huvadhu Atoll, 
|-
| 
! scope="row" | 
| Island of Nias
|-
| style="background:#b0e0e6;" | 
! scope="row" style="background:#b0e0e6;" | Indian Ocean
| style="background:#b0e0e6;" |
|-
| 
! scope="row" | 
| Islands of Sumatra, Padang, Rantau and Rangsang
|-
| style="background:#b0e0e6;" | 
! scope="row" style="background:#b0e0e6;" | Strait of Malacca
| style="background:#b0e0e6;" |
|-
| 
! scope="row" | 
| Island of Great Karimun
|-
| style="background:#b0e0e6;" | 
! scope="row" style="background:#b0e0e6;" | Singapore Strait
| style="background:#b0e0e6;" |
|-valign="top"
| 
! scope="row" | 
| Islands including Kapaladjernih, Bulan, Batam, Bintan and Mapur
|-
| style="background:#b0e0e6;" | 
! scope="row" style="background:#b0e0e6;" | South China Sea
| style="background:#b0e0e6;" |
|-
| 
! scope="row" | 
| Tambelan archipelago
|-
| style="background:#b0e0e6;" | 
! scope="row" style="background:#b0e0e6;" | South China Sea
| style="background:#b0e0e6;" |
|-
| 
! scope="row" | 
| West Kalimantan
|-
| 
! scope="row" | 
| Sarawak - for about 3 km
|-
| 
! scope="row" | 
| West Kalimantan - for about 4 km
|-
| 
! scope="row" | 
| Sarawak
|-
| 
! scope="row" | 
| West Kalimantan
|-
| 
! scope="row" | 
| Sarawak - for about 8 km
|-
| 
! scope="row" | 
| West Kalimantan
|-
| 
! scope="row" | 
| Sarawak - for about 8 km
|-
| 
! scope="row" | 
| West KalimantanEast Kalimantan
|-
| style="background:#b0e0e6;" | 
! scope="row" style="background:#b0e0e6;" | Makassar Strait
| style="background:#b0e0e6;" |
|-
| 
! scope="row" | 
| Island of Sulawesi
|-
| style="background:#b0e0e6;" | 
! scope="row" style="background:#b0e0e6;" | Celebes Sea
| style="background:#b0e0e6;" |
|-
| 
! scope="row" | 
| Island of Sulawesi
|-
| style="background:#b0e0e6;" | 
! scope="row" style="background:#b0e0e6;" | Molucca Sea
| style="background:#b0e0e6;" | Passing just north of the island of Gureda, 
|-
| 
! scope="row" | 
| Island of Halmahera
|-
| style="background:#b0e0e6;" | 
! scope="row" style="background:#b0e0e6;" | Kao Bay
| style="background:#b0e0e6;" |
|-
| 
! scope="row" | 
| Island of Halmahera
|-valign="top"
| style="background:#b0e0e6;" | 
! scope="row" style="background:#b0e0e6;" | Pacific Ocean
| style="background:#b0e0e6;" | Passing just south of the island of Fani,  Passing just north of the Mapia Islands,  Passing just south of Kapingamarangi atoll, 
|-
| 
! scope="row" | 
| Maiana atoll
|-valign="top"
| style="background:#b0e0e6;" | 
! scope="row" style="background:#b0e0e6;" | Pacific Ocean
| style="background:#b0e0e6;" | Passing just north of Howland Island,  Passing between Wolf Island and Pinta Island in the Galápagos Islands, 
|-
| 
! scope="row" | 
| Passing just north of Esmeraldas
|-
| 
! scope="row" | 
|
|-
| 
! scope="row" | 
| Amazonas
|-
| 
! scope="row" | 
|
|-
| 
! scope="row" | 
| Amazonas - for about 11 km
|-
| 
! scope="row" | 
|
|-valign="top"
| 
! scope="row" | 
| Amazonas Roraima Pará Amapá Pará - an island in the mouth of the Amazon River
|-
| style="background:#b0e0e6;" | 
! scope="row" style="background:#b0e0e6;" | Atlantic Ocean
| style="background:#b0e0e6;" |
|-
|}

See also
Equator
2nd parallel north
80th parallel south

References

n01
Equatorial Guinea–Gabon border